The EuroLeague Women is an international basketball club competition for elite clubs throughout Europe. The 2006-2007 season features 18 competing teams from 10 different countries. The draw for the groups was held on August 6, 2006, in Munich. The competition began on November 1, 2006.

Note that the competition is operated by FIBA Europe — unlike the men's Euroleague, which is run by the Euroleague Basketball (company).

Group stage

Group C

Knockout stage

Round of 16

Round of 8

 if necessary

External links
  FIBA Europe website
  EuroLeague Women official website

Fenerbahçe Basketball